The Dupes ('al-makhdūʿūn') is a 1973 Syrian drama film directed by Tewfik Saleh and starring Mohamed Kheir-Halouani, Abderrahman Alrahy, Bassan Lotfi, Saleh Kholoki and Thanaa Debsi. Based on Ghassan Kanafani's 1963 novel, Men in the Sun, the film portrays the lives of three Palestinian refugees after the 1948 Palestinian exodus by following three generations of men who made their way from Palestine to Iraq in the hope of reaching Kuwait to pursue their dreams of freedom and prosperity. The Dupes received very positive reviews from critics and won multiple awards locally and internationally. It was entered into the 8th Moscow International Film Festival, where it was nominated for the Golden Prize, and the 1972 Carthage Film Festival, where it won the Tanit d'Or.

Cast
 Mohamed Kheir-Halouani as Abou Keïss
 Abderrahman Alrahy as Abou Kheizarane
 Bassan Lofti Abou-Ghazala as Assaad
 Saleh Kholoki as Marouane
 Thanaa Debsi as Om Keïss

See also 
 Arab cinema
 Syrian cinema
 List of Syrian films

References

External links
 

1973 films
1973 drama films
Syrian drama films
1970s Arabic-language films
Films about the 1948 Palestinian exodus
Films based on short fiction
Films based on Palestinian novels
Films directed by Tewfik Saleh
Films set in Iraq
Films set in Jordan
Films set in Kuwait
Films set in Palestine (region)
Films set in 1948
Films set in 1958
Israeli–Palestinian conflict films
History of the Palestinian refugees